Hans is an eponymous Punjabi Arora clan found in India. It originates from the Sanskrit hams, meaning swan or goose. It is also a Jat clan. The name can also be found amongst the Bhangi (Chuhra) and Balmiki (Mirasi) castes.

See also 
Hans

References 

Arora clans
Khatri clans
Punjabi-language surnames
Hindu surnames
Indian surnames
Punjabi tribes